Robert Grier Lewis (born December 5, 1916 in Philadelphia, Pennsylvania, died January 6, 2011 in Ormond-by-the-Sea, Florida) was an American photographer, editor and author in the field of railways.

Life 
After completing his high school education in Germantown, Pennsylvania, he began a job with the Pennsylvania Railroad (PRR) on August 8, 1934.

From April 15, 1940 to January 15, 1941 he worked for the Bessemer and Lake Erie Railroad. From 1941 to 1942 he returned to work in the freight transport division of the Pennsylvania Railroad in Cleveland and Akron. After his military service in the US Navy from 1942 to 1946, he was again employed by the Pennsylvania Railroad.

In 1947, Lewis joined Railway Age in Chicago as assistant editor, before later rising became an editor for the magazine's transport division. In 1950 he became head of sales for Railway Age publisher Simmons-Boardman, and in 1956, editor of Railway Age. He held this position until 1995. He was also temporarily made president and chairman of the board of the Simmons-Boardman.

While at Simmons-Boardman, he was responsible for founding the International Railway Journal in 1961.

After retiring in 1995, Lewis continued to work as a consultant to the railway industry, as well as acting as Simmons-Boardman's director of special projects.

Lewis started taking pictures of trains at the age of 13, accumulating a large collection over the course of his life. He was a founding member of the Philadelphia section of the National Railroad Historical Society, founded 1936.

Publications 

 The handbook of American railroads . Simmons-Boardman 1951.
 The handbook of American railroads . Simmons-Boardman 1956.
 Railway age's comprehensive railroad dictionary . Simmons-Boardman 1984.
 Off the beaten track. A railroader's life in pictures . Simmons-Boardman 2004.
 Keystone state traction. Pennsylvania's historic trolley systems. Central Electric Railfans Association 2008.

References 

1916 births
2011 deaths
Photographers from Philadelphia
20th-century American photographers
Pennsylvania Railroad people
American magazine editors